The New Fourth Army Memorial Hall, full name "New Fourth Army National Revolutionary Army military memorial reconstruction", (Chinese:新四军纪念馆) is located in the east of Jianjun Road, Yancheng, Jiangsu, China. It was advanced as a State AAAA-class tourist attractions on 18 May 2011. It is known as the only one professional New Fourth Army Memorial Hall in China. It was built in 1985 and was finished in September 1986. Its exhibition hall is a modern architecture. There is armband pattern 'N4A',which colors blue and white, above the main entrance of the hall. And in both sides of its flag-shaped carving, it is the reflection of the historical scene where New Fourth Army joined force with the Eighth Route Army and where New fourth Army was reconstructed after the incident in Anhui. New fourth Army Memorial Hall is the base for primary and national patriotic education. There are about 1000 pictures of anti-Japanese war, a lot of historical relics and some artistic works. There is a bike with the legendary trophy named 'Manzhou'(Chinese:满洲). All its exhibition reflect the history of how New fourth Army together with common people fighting against the enemies in the war .
Something about New fourth Army:
New Fourth Army, full name 'China National Revolutionary Army Army New Fourth Army'(Chinese:中国国民革命军陆军新编第四军), is a people's army in the leadership of Chinese Communist Party for anti-Japanese War. It was established in KMT-CCP cooperation situation, by the Eighth Route Army guerrillas in Jiangxi, Fujian, Guangdong, Hunan, Hubei, Henan, Zhejiang, Anhui in 12, October in 1937. There is a special heritage in the New Fourth Army Memorial Hall—A bicycle. The owner of the bike, an 87-year-old female soldier named Li Chunhua, is still alive and she took a visit to her old comrade, the bike, after 24 years since 1986. She seized the bike from a Japanese soldier in 1943, Anti Japanese War. The bike and Li experienced many wars together and helped her to transfer the wounded, to transport supplies and to gather intelligence in the war. After the war, Li work and lived with it in 1986, Li donated it to The New Fourth Army Hall. There is a "man(满）" on the bike. It means the bike was produced by the puppet state of Manchukuo. So it was a clear evidence of the Japanese invasion of China. It has been treated very well up till now.

References 

AAAA-rated tourist attractions
Museums in Jiangsu
Buildings and structures in Yancheng